Katin is the surname of the following people:
Brendan Katin (born 1983), American baseball player
Miriam Katin (born 1942), Hungarian-born American graphic novelist
Peter Katin (1930–2015), British classical pianist and pedagogue
Elena Katina (born 1984), Russian singer and songwriter

See also
Katina (disambiguation)